The following is a list of all team-to-team transactions that have occurred in the National Hockey League during the 1978–79 NHL season. It lists what team each player has been traded to, signed by, or claimed by, and for which player(s) or draft pick(s), if applicable.

Trades between teams

May 

 Trade completed on October 28, 1978.

June 

 Trade completed on June 15, 1978.
 Trade completed on August 28, 1978.

July

August

September

October

November

December

January

February

March

April

References
 
  search for player and select "show trades"

Transactions
National Hockey League transactions